Richard Dodgshun Bedford  (born 3 January 1945), also known as Dick Bedford, is emeritus professor in human geography at Auckland University of Technology (AUT). He was the president of the Royal Society Te Apārangi from 2015 to 2018.

Early life
Bedford was born in 1945 in Takapuna. His parents were Beryl ( Sanders) and John Dodgshun Bedford. His grandfather was the academic and member of parliament Harry Bedford. He received his primary school education in East Taieri, Te Puke, Te Kauwhata, and Campbells Bay. He then attended Rangitoto College before completing a Bachelor of Arts in 1965 and a Master of Arts in 1967 at the University of Auckland. The title of his master's thesis was Resettlement: solution to economic and social problems in the Gilbert and Ellice Islands Colony. He gained his PhD from the Australian National University in Canberra in 1972, with the title of his doctoral thesis as Mobility in transition: an analysis of population movement in the New Hebrides.

In 1969, he married Janet Sholto Douglas, the daughter of Royal Air Force senior commander Sholto Douglas. They were to have one son and one daughter.

Career
From 1972 to 1989, Bedford was a geography lecturer at the University of Canterbury. From 1989, he was professor of geography at the University of Waikato. He retired from the university and in 2014, Waikato awarded him the title emeritus professor.

In 2010, Bedford moved to Auckland University of Technology (AUT) as pro vice-chancellor research. In 2016, AUT also awarded Bedford the title emeritus professor.

Bedford was president of the Royal Society Te Apārangi from July 2015 to July 2018.

Honours and awards
Bedford was awarded the New Zealand 1990 Commemoration Medal. He was elected Fellow of the Royal Society of New Zealand in 2000. He was awarded Distinguished New Zealand Geographer in 2007. In the 2008 New Year Honours, he was appointed Companion of the Queen's Service Order (QSO) for services to geography. In the 2020 New Year Honours, he was appointed Companion of the New Zealand Order of Merit (CNZM) for services to governance.

References

1945 births
Living people
People educated at Rangitoto College
University of Auckland alumni
Australian National University alumni
Academic staff of the University of Canterbury
Academic staff of the University of Waikato
Academic staff of the Auckland University of Technology
New Zealand geographers
People from Takapuna
Companions of the Queen's Service Order
Companions of the New Zealand Order of Merit
Presidents of the Royal Society of New Zealand
Human geographers